Jean Adolphe Louis Robert Flavigny (1880-1948) was a French general. He was imprisoned in Colditz from 19 January 1945.

References

1880 births
1948 deaths
French generals
French military personnel of World War II
Prisoners of war held at Colditz Castle